The Shadow People may refer to:

 The Shadow People (audiobook), a Sarah Jane Adventures audiobook
 "The Shadow People", a 1952 Hall of Fantasy radio drama featuring a character from the Sheridan Le Fanu novel Carmilla
 The Shadow People, a 1969 science fiction novel by Margaret St. Clair
 Shadow people or shadow person, a paranormal or supernatural belief
 Shadow People (film), a 2013 American horror film